Andhra Christian Theological College (ACTC) is a seminary in Telangana which was founded in 1964. It is affiliated with India's first university, the Senate of Serampore College (University) (a university under section 2(f) of the University Grants Commission Act, 1956), and has degree-granting authority under a Danish charter ratified by the government of West Bengal.

The college was founded on the Lutheran Theological College campus in Rajahmundry and the founding societies included the Andhra Evangelical Lutheran Church, the Church of South India, the Convention of Baptist Churches of Northern Circars, the Methodist Church in India and the South Andhra Lutheran Church. The Samavesam of Telugu Baptist Churches held its B.D. classes at ACTC in 1967, and in 1972 the B.D. programme of the Ramayapatnam Baptist Theological Seminary was integrated into the college. When M. Victor Paul was principal (1991–1993), Good Samaritan Evangelical Lutheran Church joined the college.

Christian missions in Andhra Pradesh opened seminaries in Gooty (Union Theological Seminary), Dornakal (Andhra Union Theological College, for the Church of South India), Ramayapatnam (Baptist Theological Seminary, for the American Baptists), Luthergiri (Lutheran Theological College), Kakinada (Baptist Theological Seminary, for Canadian Baptists) and Shamshabad (Mennonite Brethren Centenary Bible College, for the Anabaptists). Although professors were exchanged among the seminaries, Bachelor of Divinity students attended Serampore College in West Bengal.

Overview

Kretzmann Commission

ACTC constituted the Kretzmann Commission in 1969, consisting of:
 M. L. Kretzmann, D.D., secretary for planning, study and research of the Lutheran World Federation's Department of World Missions
 K. Devasahayam, M.A., B.D. (Hon.), S.T.M., Andhra Evangelical Lutheran Church
 A. B. Masilamani, M.A., Th.M., Convention of Baptist Churches of Northern Circars
 C. S. Sundaresan, bishop of the Church of South India's Diocese of Rayalaseema

The commission's report, presented to the board of governors, suggested increasing the Bachelor of Divinity curriculum and abolishing the Licentiate in Theology programme.

Merger

In 1964, the college was founded in Luthergiri, Rajahmundry, East Godavari with the merger of three theological colleges: 
Andhra Union Theological College in Dornakal, Baptist Theological Seminary in Kakinada, and Lutheran Theological College in Rajahmundry.

With William D. Coleman as its first principal, the college was dedicated on 1 July 1964 by R. M. Clark of the BTESSC. The inaugural address was delivered by Senate of Serampore College registrar C. Devasahayam in Rajahmundry.

The Ramayapatnam Baptist Theological Seminary was a separate part of the college in Rajahmundry until it merged in 1972. By 1973, the college had moved from Rajahmundry to Secunderabad due to pollution from nearby paper mills. The new buildings were dedicated by Church of South India bishop Pereji Solomon in the presence of Catholic archbishop Samineni Arulappa and seminarians from St. John's Regional Seminary. During the 1990s, the college's postal address changed to Hyderabad (now in Telangana).

Administration and faculty

Board of governors

The college is administered by a board of governors composed of representatives of participating Protestant ecclesiastical societies:
 Telangana
 Church of South India (CSI) Dioceses of Dornakal, Karimnagar, Medak (headquartered in Dornakal, Karimnagar and Medak)
 Good Samaritan Evangelical Lutheran Church (headquartered in Bhadrachalam)
 Methodist Church in India, Hyderabad Regional Conference
 Samavesam of Telugu Baptist Churches Society, Deccan Association
 Tamil Nadu
 CSI Dioceses of Madras and Vellore (headquartered in Chennai and Vellore)
 Andhra Pradesh
 Andhra Evangelical Lutheran Church, headquartered in Guntur
 CSI Dioceses of Krishna-Godavari, Nandyal and Rayalaseema (headquartered in Machilipatnam, Nandyal and Kadapa, respectively)
 Convention of Baptist Churches of Northern Circars, originally headquartered in Kakinada
 Samavesam of Telugu Baptist Churches, originally headquartered in Nellore
 South Andhra Lutheran Church, headquartered in Tirupati

Motto

The college motto is derived from Ephesians 4:12, which reads in the Latin Vulgate: "Ad consummationem sanctorum in opus ministerii..." ("For the perfecting of the saints, for the work of the ministry..." in the King James Version).

Hall system
W. D. Coleman, the college's first principal, explained the hall system: "Each of the participating denominations has its own 'hall'. There are two hours of instruction each week about the liturgy, history, and policy of each denomination".

The churches commonly associated with Protestantism in southern India include the Anglicans, Congregationalists, Wesleyan Methodists, Baptists, Lutherans and Methodists. Each church has its own tradition. At ACTC, students learn their respective church doctrine in addition to general theology.

Principals
The principal serves a four-year term (2022-2026), with each participating church having an opportunity to provide a principal. The current principal is the Rev. T. Swami Raju, D.Th. (Serampore).

Serampore University affiliation
The college has affiliated since its founding with the Senate of Serampore College (University).

Degrees for pastors
ACTC and Serampore offer two degrees for pastors: Bachelor of Divinity (B.D.) and Master of Theology (M. Th.) under the aegis of Advanced Institute for Research on Religion and Culture (ARRC).

Distance education
Through distance education, ACTC has Bachelor of Christian Studies (B.C.S.) and Master of Christian Studies (M.C.S.) programmes for Christian students and a Diploma in Christian Studies (Dip. C.S.) programme for Christian and non-Christian students.

Registrar visits
When the college was founded in 1964, university registrar Chetti Devasahayam (CBCNC) delivered its inaugural address; registrar D. S. Satyaranjan visited the college annually. Current registrar S. K. Patro has visited ACTC to investigate the prospect of upgrading the college to a postgraduate institution.

University convocations

 Senate of Serampore College (University) has held two convocations at ACTC. The February 1979 convocation was hosted by college during the tenures of the Old Testament faculty Victor Premasagar, CSI and G. Babu Rao, CBCNC; both had been associated with the Serampore College. The convocation was attended by university registrar D. S. Satyaranjan and master A. D. Khan. The university president was Victor Premasagar. The Commemoration Mass was led by G. Babu Rao (CBCNC) at St. Gregorios Malankara Orthodox Syrian Cathedral near the college, and the convocation address was delivered by Samuel Rayan, S.J.
 The college hosted the 2016 convocation under the tenure of Old Testament scholars T. Matthews Emmanuel, CBCNC and Vasantha Rao, CSI. The university was represented by master John Sadananda, Senate president Issac Mar Philoxenos, South Asia Theological Research Institute dean P. G. George and university registrar S. K. Patro. The convocation address was delivered by Klaus Schäfer. honorary doctoral degrees were conferred on D. S. Satyaranjan (who led the 1979 convocation) and Klaus Schäfer, who taught New Testament courses at the college from 1988 to 1993.

Master of Divinity programme through ATA
The college has begun an initiative to admit Christian candidates to a M.Div. programme, for which it has been accredited by the Asia Theological Association.

Academics

Library

ACTC's library has reading-room facilities, over 38,000 books and 35 periodicals. When the college was founded, it was known as the Dunkelberger Memorial Library. The Evangelical Lutheran Church in America had sponsored the library in memory of Roy Martin Dunkelberger, AELC, a Lutheran missionary in Rajahmundry.

The library was renamed the Gipson Memorial Library in 2014 in honour of Baptist missionary T. G. Gipson, STBC, who had modernized the library during his second term as a visiting faculty member at the college. The renaming ceremony was held during the tenure of T. Matthews Emmanuel (CBCNC) as principal, in the presence of board of governors chair K. Frederick Paradesi Babu (AELC) and board member V. Prasada Rao (CSI).

Student life
ACTC has recreational facilities which include throwball, tennis, basketball and volleyball courts, a table tennis room and a playing field for football and cricket. Daily mass is said in the chapel for students and teachers, and Sunday mass is open to the public. College festivals include the Christian Home Festival, Carey Day, CSI Day, Reformation Day, and Independence Day.

Notable figures

Notes

References

Further reading
 
 
 
 
 
 
 
 

1964 establishments in Andhra Pradesh
Anglican seminaries and theological colleges
Christian seminaries and theological colleges in India
Colleges in Andhra Pradesh
Convention of Baptist Churches of Northern Circars
Educational institutions established in 1964
Reformed church seminaries and theological colleges
Seminaries and theological colleges affiliated to the Senate of Serampore College (University)
Universities and colleges affiliated with the Church of South India
Universities and colleges in Hyderabad, India
Canadian Baptist Ministries